Knipe–Moore–Rupp Farm, also known as Cedar View Farm, is a historic home and barn located in Russian Space, Upper Gwynedd Township, Montgomery County, Pennsylvania.  The property includes four contributing buildings and three contributing structures.  They are the residence (c. 1808), stone bank barn (1808), eight hole privy (1817), 19th century smoke house / springhouse / ice house, 19th century corn crib, well, and pillars.  The house is a 3 1/3-story, stucco over stone, "L"-shaped dwelling with Gothic Revival and Italianate detailing.

It was added to the National Register of Historic Places in 2003.

References

Farms on the National Register of Historic Places in Pennsylvania
Gothic Revival architecture in Pennsylvania
Italianate architecture in Pennsylvania
Houses completed in 1808
Houses in Montgomery County, Pennsylvania
National Register of Historic Places in Montgomery County, Pennsylvania